Donald Peter Mojuntin is a Malaysian politician and lawyer who served as the Senator from December 2018 to December 2021, Member of the Sabah State Legislative Assembly (MLA) for Moyog from March 2008 to May 2013 and Member of Parliament (MP) for Penampang from March 2004 to March 2008. He is a member of the United Progressive Kinabalu Organisation (UPKO), a component party of the Pakatan Harapan (PH) coalition. He has served as the Vice President of PH since August 2021 and Deputy President of UPKO since November 2019.

Early life and education 
Donald Peter Mojuntin was born in St. Joseph Maternitiy Home, Penampang on 26 January 1965. He studied in the Sacred Heart Primary School, La Salle Secondary School and Ratcliffe College. He was awarded a Bachelor of Law (Hons.) in 1984 from University of Westminster.

He worked as a lawyer in firm of Richard Malajum, Idang & Rantau from 1991 to 1992, Mojuntin & Doudlim from 1992 to 1993, and Donald Mojuntin & Seibing Gunting from 1994 to 1995.

Politics 
He became the Political Secretary for the Sabah Minister of Tourism and Environment in 1995 and for the Chief Minister of Sabah, Bernard Giluk Dompok in 1998. He was also the Private Secretary for the Minister in the Prime Minister Department from 2002 to 2003. Furthermore, he was the Assistant for the Sabah Minister of Resources and Information Technology Development Sabah from 2008 to 2009  and Sabah Finance Minister from 2009 to 2013.

He joined UPKO Penampang in 1994 and was appointed as a Member of  UPKO Supreme Council and Chairman of UPKO Kepayan Division. He was also the Youth Chief of UPKO Penampang and Deputy Chairman of UPKO Penampang.

Private life 
He married his wife, Pornnipa Rattanaruangjit on 26 June 1989 when they are studying in London. His hobby is playing badminton, football and golf.

Election result

Honours 
  :
  Commander of the Order of Kinabalu (PGDK) - Datuk (2010)

References 

21st-century Malaysian politicians
People from Sabah
Independent politicians in Malaysia
United Progressive Kinabalu Organisation politicians
Members of the Dewan Rakyat
Members of the Dewan Negara
Members of the Sabah State Legislative Assembly
Living people
1965 births
Commanders of the Order of Kinabalu